Matched may refer to:
 Matched filter, a filter used in signal processing
 Matched betting, a betting technique
 Matched trilogy, a dystopian fiction trilogy of books, by Ally Condie
 Matched (book), the first book in the trilogy